Williams Lake Secondary School was a public high school in Williams Lake in the Canadian province of British Columbia. The school was administered as part of School District 27 Cariboo-Chilcotin. It was a grade 8 to 12 facility enrolling approximately 600 students. The principal is Silvia Dubray.
 
Before 1999 the school, which is often called "WL" or "WLSS", only included grades 8-10 and was known as Williams Lake Junior Secondary.

In June 2013, the school was closed and merged with Columneetza Secondary School to form Lake City Secondary School.

Alumni

Carey Price- Professional Hockey Player

Notes

High schools in British Columbia
Educational institutions in Canada with year of establishment missing